The Galathée class was a type of 32-gun frigates of the French Navy, designed by Raymond-Antoine Haran, with 26 × 12-pounder and 6 × 6-pounder guns. six units were built in all, seeing service during the Naval operations in the American Revolutionary War, and later in the French Revolutionary Wars. The Royal Navy captured and took into service five of the six, the sixth being wrecked early in the French Revolutionary Wars.

 Galathée
Builder: Rochefort
Ordered: 
Launched: 1779
Fate: wrecked in 1795

 Railleuse
Builder: Bordeaux
Ordered: 
Launched: 1779
Fate: sold as a privateer and captured in 1804 by the Royal Navy. Taken into British service as HMS Antigua.

 Fleur de Lys
Builder: Rochefort
Ordered: 
Launched: 1785
Fate: renamed to Pique, captured by the Royal Navy and taken into British service as HMS Pique in 1796

 Charente Inférieure
Builder: Rochefort
Ordered: 
Launched: 1793
Fate: renamed Tribune in February 1794, captured by British Navy in 1796 and taken into British service as HMS Tribune, being wrecked the next year

 Républicaine française
Builder: Bordeaux
Ordered: 
Launched: 1794
Fate: renamed Renommée in 1795; captured by British Navy in 1796, becoming HMS Renommee. Broken up 1810

Décade Française
Builder: Pierre Guibert, Bordeaux
Ordered: 
Launched: 1794
Fate: Renamed Décade in 1795; captured by British navy in 1798, becoming HMS Decade. Sold 1811

References
Winfield, Rif & Stephen S Roberts (2015) French Warships in the Age of Sail 1786–1861: Design Construction, Careers and Fates. (Seaforth Publishing). 

 
Frigate classes